The 1995–96 Algerian Cup was the 31st edition of the Algerian Cup. MC Oran won the Cup by defeating USM Blida 1-0. It was MC Oran fourth Algerian Cup in its history.

Round of 64

Round of 32

Round of 16

Quarter-finals

Semi-finals

Final

Champions

External links
 1995/96 Coupe Nationale

Algerian Cup
Algerian Cup
Algerian Cup